John Hall was an English professional footballer who played as a winger.

References

Year of birth unknown
Year of death unknown
People from Hetton-le-Hole
Footballers from Tyne and Wear
English footballers
Association football wingers
Burnley F.C. players
English Football League players